Luigi Serafini may refer to
Luigi Serafini (artist) (born 1949), Italian artist and designer
Luigi Serafini (basketball) (born 1951), Italian basketball player
Luigi Serafini (cardinal) (1808–1894), Roman Catholic bishop and cardinal